Belmont is an unincorporated community located in Bullitt County, Kentucky, United States.

History
Belmont was a station on the railroad. A post office was established at Belmont in 1854.

References

Unincorporated communities in Bullitt County, Kentucky
Unincorporated communities in Kentucky